Athena is a 1995 novel by John Banville, the third in a series that started with The Book of Evidence and continued with Ghosts.

In it a woman steps out of her lover's canvasses. It contains a character called Morrow. There is murder, art and Greek mythology. There is also a serial killer.

Reviewers compared it favourably with the writing of John Fowles, William Gass, John Hawkes and Vladimir Nabokov.

References

1995 Irish novels
Novels by John Banville
Secker & Warburg books